Michael Philip West (1888–1973) was an English language teacher and researcher who worked extensively in India in the mid 1900s. He produced the reading scheme "The New Method Readers" (Longmans, Green and Co) and A General Service List of English Words (Longman, Harlow, Essex, 1953).

References

Further reading
 "Michael West" entry in the Warwick ELT Archive Hall of Fame
 Biography
 

1888 births
1973 deaths
Teachers of English as a second or foreign language